The Cleburne County Courthouse is a Classical Revival courthouse in Heflin, Alabama.  It was built in 1907, after the county seat of Cleburne County was moved from Edwardsville to Heflin in 1905.  The wings of the courthouse were expanded in 1938 using funds from the Federal Emergency Administration of Public Works.  It was listed on the National Register of Historic Places in 1976.

References

External links

National Register of Historic Places in Cleburne County, Alabama
Neoclassical architecture in Alabama
Government buildings completed in 1907
Clock towers in Alabama
Courthouses on the National Register of Historic Places in Alabama
County courthouses in Alabama
Historic American Buildings Survey in Alabama